Noel Voigt (born 15 December 1935) is  a former Australian rules footballer who played with Hawthorn in the Victorian Football League (VFL).

References

External links 		
		
		
		
		
		
		
Living people		
1935 births		
People educated at Carey Baptist Grammar School
Australian rules footballers from Victoria (Australia)		
Hawthorn Football Club players